The red-billed malkoha (Zanclostomus javanicus) is a species of cuckoo in the family Cuculidae. It is found in Brunei, Indonesia, Malaysia, Myanmar, and Thailand. Its natural habitat is subtropical or tropical dry forests.

References

Cuculidae
Birds of Malesia
red-billed malkoha
Taxonomy articles created by Polbot